Pseudascalenia abbasella is a moth in the family Cosmopterigidae. It is found in Iran.

References

Natural History Museum Lepidoptera generic names catalog

Cosmopterigidae